The Alexander Garden Obelisk is an obelisk located within the Alexander Garden, near the walls of Kremlin, in Moscow, Russia. The obelisk was initially designed by S. A. Vlasev and erected on July 10, 1914, at the entrance of the garden. It was created as a celebration of the tercentenary of the House of Romanov. The obelisk was moved closer to the center of the garden in 1966.

Soon after the revolution, by dismantling its parts, the drum was filled with reliefs and counter-reliefs that were then converted into a Monument-obelisk to commemorate the "outstanding thinkers and personalities of the struggle for the liberation of workers". It thus became the first monumental statue of the new state.

In 2013, on the 400th anniversary of the Romanov dynasty, the monument was dismantled for the sake of creating a modern replica of the original monument to the Russian rulers of the Romanov dynasty. According to specialists, the original monument was almost lost in the process.

Russian Empire 
Made in Vlasieva, the project of the obelisk (under the motto "the Truth") won the 2nd place in a special contest titled "Project of the Monument-Obelisk to Commemorate the 300th Anniversary of the Romanov Dynasty" in 1912, which was celebrated in 1913. Money for its construction came from the city; up to fifty thousand rubles was allocated by the Moscow city Duma.

Since the initial plan did not gain the approval of the Academy of Arts and Vlasyevo, it took some time to correct the shortcomings as direct work on the construction of the monument only began in the spring of 1914. The solemn ceremony of a bookmark, which was attended by representatives of various social classes[Comm 1], was held on April 18, 1914. During the laying of the first stone of the obelisk, in it had a basis of V. D. Bryansk, the second A. A. Adrianov, the third Prince N. N. Odoevsky-Maslov, fourth Earl N. L. Ants and fifth — N. I. Guchkov. The ceremony was ended with the threefold singing of God Save the Tsar!, the national anthem of Russia.

"Leading to the Alexandrovsky garden from Voskresenskaya Square gate and surrounding iron fence were decorated with national flags. Near the obelisk, closer to the Kremlin wall, there was a small elevation, beautifully draped with garlands of greenery; on the dais was placed Muscovites revered relic — the miraculous icon of the Iveron Mother of God. Along the entire length of the alley of the Boulevard stood the rows of cadets of the Alexander, Alexis and Tver cavalry school and part of the troops of the Moscow garrison with orchestra music."

At half-past 11pm, Reverend Demetrius and Bishop of Mozhaysk, assisted by the Deputy Spiritual Department in the city, Duma Archpriest N. S. Vinogradov and other clergy had given thanks with the blessing of water to the singing of the choir of the Cathedral of Christ the Savior. Before the end of the molieben his Eminence Dimitri spoke a word, that indicated a high significance of the monument erected, which is continually broadcast to the residents of the mother, seen of great service to Russia of the Reigning House of Romanov. The thanksgiving ended with the proclamation of many years to the Emperor, the Empress, the Crown Prince and Heir to the entire Russian Royal House and the eternal memory of resting in the Lord crowned members of the Romanov family. After that, Bishop Demetrius ascended the steps of the monument and sprinkled Holy water on all four sides. The choir sang the national anthem.
Then there was a parade in the garden of the troops. The parade was commanded by the commander of the 1st Grenadier brigade, major General Holmsen. The parade commander of the Moscow Military district the General-of-cavalry P. A. Pleve, appearing in the middle of the front troops, proclaimed a toast for your Adored Sovereign Master of the Russian Land of the Emperor and the whole Reigning House. The troops, taking "on-guard" position, replied with thunderous, long smolkowski cheers; the orchestra played God save the Tsar! Then, General P. A. Pleve declared a toast to the prosperity and welfare of the city of Moscow, built a glorious monument, "Wow Moscow!" — said General Pleve, and in response to this, there was a mighty Bang; the orchestra played the March of the Transfiguration. I. D. mayor, V. D. Bryansk on behalf of the city of Moscow thanked the General P. A. Pleve and proclaimed a toast. Then the troops were overlooked by the ceremonial March. General P. A. Pleve thanked valiant and held a military unit" ("Moscow news" No. 134 – June 11, 1914).

Original appearance 

The memorial was erected in the Upper Alexander garden near the main gate, leading from Voskresenskaya square in the Alexander garden.

The monument consists of two parts. Foursided obelisk of Finnish granite was crowned with a double-headed eagle. At the top of the obelisk sits the coat of arms of the Romanov boyars — a Griffin with sword and shield. Below were inscribed the names of the kings and emperors of the Romanov dynasty from Mikhail Fyodorovich to Nicholas II (except for Ivan VI Antonovich; after "Empress Anna Ioannovna" comes "Empress Elizabeth Petrovna"). The cubic base had a relief of Saint George and the small coats of arms of provinces and regions of Russia in shields.

"Romanovsky obelisk is erected under the project of architect S. A. Vlasiev in that part of the Alexander garden, which is next to the Voskresenskaya square. For setting the composition of the monument represents a cubic pedestal, on which stands the obelisk, ending in a gilt bronze double-headed eagle. The whole monument rests on two plateaus that are elevated at 0.60 fathoms above the surface of the earth. The monument is constructed from grey finish granite with embossed inscriptions, coats of arms and ornaments.  The upper part of the monument (obelisk) is made of seven monolithic granite pieces and the lower one of granite-faced slabs. The obelisk crowning the double-headed eagle is from cast bronze, chased and gilded. In the inscription on the obelisk are the names and patronymics of all the kings and queens throughout the tercentenary of the House of Romanov in chronological order, beginning with Tsar Mikhail Fedorovich and ending with the name of the reigning Sovereign Emperor. On the upper part of the anniversary inscription is the coat of arms of the House of Romanov, and on the pedestal is an inscription reading: "In memory of the 300th of the accession of the House of Romanov" and the coats of arms of Moscow, Kazan, Astrakhan, Poland, Siberia, Georgia; the United Coats of Arms of the Grand Duchies of Kiev, Vladimir, Novgorod, arms of the Grand Duchy of Finland"
("Moscow news", No. 90 – April 19, 1914)

The Soviet period 

Adopted after the October revolution, Lenin's plan of monumental propaganda involved the demolition of "monuments in honor of tsars and their servants" (the decree of the CPC 12.04.18 G. "On removing monuments erected in honor of tsars and their servants and the elaboration of projects of monuments of Russian Socialist Revolution") and the construction of a large number of monuments and memorial plaques in honor of the fighters of the revolution of all times and peoples. The obelisk in the Alexander garden, without being physically liquidated, embodied both sides of Lenin's plan — it was turned into a monument to the leaders of the socialist and Communist thoughts and their precursors.

During August–September 1918, according to the decision of the city Council Executive Committee, dated August 17, 1918 under the direction of architect N. A. Vsevolozhsky, the obelisk was altered:

 the eagle from the peak was removed (with the help of the Latvian Riflemen)
 emblems with the Foundation were removed (cartouche and shields from the coats of arms preserved)
 in the central cartouche, the image of Saint George was replaced with the inscription "R. S. F. S. R." and "Proletarians of all countries, unite!")
 the names of the kings of the needle of the obelisk were shot down. In their place a list was put of 19 social thinkers and political figures, approved by Lenin. The list of names was entrusted to a prominent Bolshevik, Vladimir Friche.

The order of the names is not chronological: the list begins with Marx and Engels, followed by three of the founders of the German Social Democratic Party (1860) and then the figures of the utopian socialism of the XVI and following centuries, also non-chronologically. The complete list contains five Russians — representatives of different political currents, including subsequently the opposition to Bolshevism (for example, the populist N. K. Mikhailovsky, anarchist M. A. Bakunin and Menshevik G. V. Plekhanov). There are no Bolsheviks named on the stele (the list included only deceased figures, the last of them, Plekhanov, died the same year as the alteration of the monument).
" The alteration of the monument was the actual and symbolic value: a revolution that destroyed the tsarist dynasty destroyed the obelisk that is associated with the glorification of the dynasty, and erased all the names of its rulers" (the magazine of Art, 1939) "

The opening of the monument, called "Monument obelisk outstanding thinkers and personalities of the struggle for the liberation of workers", was timed to coincide with the first anniversary of the Revolution and took place in October 1918.

Inscribed names 
In order, they are:
 Karl Marx
 Friedrich Engels
 Wilhelm Liebknecht
 Ferdinand Lassalle
 August Bebel
 Tommaso Campanella
 Jean Meslier
 Gerrard Winstanley
 Thomas More
 Claude-Henri Saint-Simon
 Edouard Vaillant
 Charles Fourier
 Jean Jaurès
 Pierre Joseph Proudhon
 Mikhail Bakunin
 Nikolay Chernyshevsky
 Pyotr Lavrov
 Nikolay Mikhaylovsky
 Georgi Plekhanov

Move 
In 1966, the monument, originally located at the entrance to the upper garden, was moved to the center of the upper gardens to the grotto "Ruins" in connection with the construction of the memorial "Tomb of the Unknown Soldier".

Just at this place on the 3rd of November, 1918, the first anniversary of the Revolution, was established and stood for several days the concrete figure of Robespierre (work of sculptor B. J. Sandomirsky). But soon the monument was blown up by unknown persons — on the 7th of November, the sculpture was found destroyed. "Northern commune" reported: "the Monument to Robespierre on the night of 6th to 7th of November had been destroyed by someone's criminal hand. The figure of Robespierre, made of concrete, turned into a pile of small fragments scattered around. The pedestal has survived. On a guarded scene and put under investigation". However, another newspaper, "Izvestia", offered another version of the monument allegedly collapsed", due to improper location of the center of gravity of the whole figure of the monument is that it was noticed even when it was being built".

Recent years 

The proposal to restore Romanovsky obelisk in its original form to the 400th anniversary of the Romanov house has been repeatedly heard from members of the public, in particular, the Fund's "Return".
At the beginning of 2013 Vice-President of Fund "Return" on legal issues, Daniel Petrov said that "another appeal of Fund "Return" on Romanovsky obelisk, mutilated by Bolsheviks and standing in the Alexander garden near the Kremlin wall, finally, gave a preliminary result. The Ministry of culture is ready to consider returning the monument to its historic appearance". According to him, now "the Ministry needs ALL the documentary and historical materials on this monument, including local literature in Moscow". In this regard, he urged Russian historians and ethnographers to connect to this work, and "if anyone has materials on this subject (articles in books, guidebooks, photos before 1918 and after), etc., I am grateful for them sending me to message the Ministry of Culture".
May 27, 2013, in the Alexander garden, on visual axis "Manezhnaya Square, the obelisk is the grotto" was erected an entirely new monument to Patriarch Hermogenes. After nearly a month, July 2, 2013, the obelisk was dismantled for reconstruction, without prior announcement, which caused questions from some residents about its fate. The press-Secretary of Department of presidential Affairs Viktor Khrekov explained that the monument will return to its place by November 4. According to him, the obelisk was dismantled, because "when you transfer to a new place in Soviet times, mistakes were made, which further has led to the fact that the obelisk tilted and began to pose a serious threat to people". A special working group under the Ministry of Culture came to the conclusion that the monument was "necessary to restore and strengthen the foundations". The restoration of the obelisk has been in charge of the company "Alfastroy", questioned for not having the proper license. For the restoration of the monument was found a Karelian marble that was originally used to create the obelisk.

At the end of October 2013, the restored monument began to be mounted. Sculptor Nikolai Avvakumov found mistakes and inaccuracies when the restoration took place. In particular, the inscriptions were made standard font Izhitsa Cyrillic, while in some words there is a spelling error; the reconstructed image also does not correspond to the original. At the same time, the photographs of the monument, common on an opening day, November 4, 2013, two of the Avvakumov spelling errors have been fixed (hard sign in the word "memory" has been replaced with soft, added existed in the original text the hyphen in the word "300th anniversary").

Public movement "Arhnadzor" declared that "the restoration of the obelisk took place without any open expert and public discussion of its plan and project", in the end, "the original of 1914 has not been raised, and the original 1918 died in Alexander garden is now showing off a replica, not a monument of any era." Later "Arhnadzor" declared that "carried out in 2013 on the obelisk of work cannot be called restoration."

Popular culture 

 Soviet school book to read — A. P. Shikman, "Obelisk in Alexandrovsky garden: lives of the great socialists" (1990) consisted of biographical essays about people whose names were carved on the obelisk.
 Dimitry Valovoi & Henrietta Lapshina. Names on an Obelisk. Moscow: Progress Publishers. 1983. English-language Soviet book providing short biographies of the persons named on the obelisk.

1914 establishments in the Russian Empire
Buildings and structures completed in 1914
Monuments and memorials in Moscow
House of Romanov
Obelisks in Russia
Cultural heritage monuments of federal significance in Moscow